Bruce Johnson (born February 18, 1987) is a former American American football and Canadian football cornerback. He played for the New York Giants of the National Football League (NFL) and the Winnipeg Blue Bombers of the Canadian Football League (CFL). He played college football at the University of Miami and high school football at Suwannee High School in Live Oak.

High school
As a senior in 2004, Johnson played cornerback and wide receiver, making 44 solo tackles along with 17 assisted tackle, one forced fumble, and two interceptions, along with 39 receptions for 546 yards and three touchdowns, and was named District Player of the Year. Out of high school he was ranked the 20th best cornerback by Scout.com. He chose Miami over Auburn and Clemson.

Professional career

New York Giants
After going undrafted in the 2009 NFL Draft, Johnson was signed as an undrafted free agent by the New York Giants.  On September 20, 2009, he returned a Tony Romo interception 34 yards for a touchdown against the Dallas Cowboys. On December 21, 2009, he recorded his second interception of the season for 49 yards against the Washington Redskins on Monday Night Football. The Redskins ran the Swinging Gate on that play before halftime with punter Hunter Smith at Quarterback which resulted in Johnson getting the interception. He ended his rookie season with 46 total tackles, 1.0 sacks, 2 forced fumbles, 8 passes defended, 2 interceptions and a touchdown.

After a promising rookie season, only played in 6 games in 2010 after undergoing arthroscopic knee surgery.

Johnson missed the entire 2011 season with a ruptured Achilles tendon that he suffered before the season even began.

Personal
Johnson is the nephew of former Miami Hurricane teammate Kelly Jennings.

References

External links
Miami Hurricanes bio

1987 births
Living people
People from Live Oak, Florida
Players of American football from Florida
American football cornerbacks
American football return specialists
Miami Hurricanes football players
New York Giants players
Winnipeg Blue Bombers players
African-American players of American football
African-American players of Canadian football
Canadian football defensive backs
21st-century African-American sportspeople
20th-century African-American people